Simas Kurdika (9 April 1930 – 11 February 2023) was a Lithuanian sailor. He is best known for the attempted defection from the Soviet Union in 1970 and subsequent activism against the Soviet regime in Lithuania.  An important outcome of the incident was the creation of the improved guidelines for handling defections by American officials.

Biography
He worked as a radio operator on various ships from 1956 to 1970. On 23 November 1970, during a bilateral negotiations between the United States and the Soviet Union regarding fishing rights, he jumped from his ship, the trawler Sovetskaya Litva, onto the American coast guard ship, the USCGC Vigilant (WMEC-617). He requested political asylum, but was detained and forcibly returned to the Soviet ship by Soviet troops who had been let on board by the Americans. 

Actions by U.S. and Soviet officials were condemned by American news sources, particularly the Voice of America. President Richard Nixon was angered by the incident, because of the violation of the procedure of handling the defection cases. After that three high officers associated with the incident were relieved from the duties. A more important outcome was the creation of the new guidelines for handling defections, which  made the standing procedures more specific to ensure that similar situations would not happen again.

In May 1971, Kurdika was sentenced to 10 years of correctional labour camps and he served his time in camps in Pskov Oblast and Mordovia. His mother, who had been born in the United States, regained her U.S. citizenship, and Kurdika managed to secure release from imprisonment in 1974. He moved to the United States with his family and gave lectures about the communist regime in Lithuania. He returned to Lithuania in 2000, ten years after the country's independence.

Kurdika died in Pilviškiai on 11 February 2023, at the age of 92.

Honors
Commander of the Order of the Cross of Vytis (2008)

Works about Kudirka
Several books and films have been produced about the life and story of Kurdika:
Simas (1971) – book written by Jurgis Gliauda
Day of Shame (1973) – book written by Algis Rukšėnas
Simas Kudirka in Chicago (1974) – film directed by Algimantas Kezys
The Defection of Simas Kudirka (1978) – television film that won two Emmys
For Those Still at Sea (1978) – book written by Kudirka and Lawrence E. Eichel
The Jump (2020) – Lithuanian documentary film

References

Further reading
 Smith, Terence. Coast Guard Officers Relieved Of Duties in Defector Incident, New York Times, 4 December 1970.
 Coast Guard Officers Relieved Of Duties in Defector Incident, New York Times, 5 December 1970.
 U. S. Documents Hint Admiral Made Decision to Return Defector, New York Times, 8 December 1970.
 Coast Guard Aide Critical on Defector, New York Times, 9 December 1970.
 Coast Guard Will Retire 2 Who Blocked Defection, New York Times, 21 December 1970.
 Fidell, Eugene R. How to (Mis)Handle a Defection, Proceedings, Annapolis, Maryland: U.S. Naval Institute Press, 2008 (with many photos).
 Agnė Fabijonavičiūtė. Lietuvių gyventojų pabėgimai ir mėginimai ištrūkti iš Sovietų Sąjungos
 Į JAV bėgęs ir už SSRS išdavimą kalėjęs S.Kudirka: visas Lietuvos gyvenimas persunktas bolševikine dvasia
 Virginija Skučaitė. Šuolio į laisvę kaina. Kauno diena, 2008-11-15
 Attempted Defection by Lithuanian Seaman Simas Kudirka: Hearings Before the Subcommittee on State Department Organization and Foreign Operations…, 91-2, December 3, 7-9, 14, 17, 18, 29, 1970
Жизнь и приключения одной поправки. Законодатели против коммунизма, Radio Freedom, November 17, 2019
A detailed description of the incident (in Russian)

1930 births
2023 deaths
Lithuanian sailors
Soviet sailors
Soviet defectors to the United States
Gulag detainees
Lithuanian emigrants to the United States
Recipients of the Order of the Cross of Vytis
People from Šakiai District Municipality
Lithuanian anti-communists
Lithuanian prisoners and detainees